The Alaska congressional election of 1976 was held on Tuesday, November 2, 1976. The term of the state's sole Representative to the United States House of Representatives expired on January 3, 1977. The winning candidate would serve a two-year term from January 3, 1977, to January 3, 1979.

General election

Results

References

Alaska
1976
House, U.S.